Lei(s) or variation may refer to:

Arts and entertainment 
 Lei (TV channel), a defunct Italian satellite broadcast
 Lei Wulong, a fictional character from the Tekken gaming franchise

Businesses and organisations 
 L.E.I., an American fashion brand for girls
LEI Wageningen UR, a Dutch research institute
Lashkar-e-Islam (LeI), a Pakistani jihadist group
Leiden University, public research university in the Netherlands

Economics and finance 
 Lei, plural of the currency Leu, referring to either:
 Moldovan leu
 Romanian leu
 Legal Entity Identifier, a system to track all parties to a financial security transaction
Index of Leading Economic Indicators

People 
 Lei (surname)
 A female given name
 A male given name

Places 
 Almería Airport, Spain (IATA code: LEI)
 Lei, Italy, a small town in Sardinia
 Lago di Lei, an artificial lake on the Italian–Swiss border
Leicestershire, a county in central England  (Chapman code: LEI)
Leicester railway station (GBR code: LEI)

Science and technology 
Lotus Enterprise Integrator, a Lotus Domino software application
Low-energy ion scattering (LEIS), a technique used to characterize the chemical and structural makeup of materials

Other uses 
 Lei (garland), a Hawaiian flower necklace
 Lei (vessel), a type of ancient Chinese earthenware wine jar
Lessico etimologico italiano, an etymological dictionary of Italian
Leis (mythology)

See also
 Ley (disambiguation)